Bordeleau is a French-language surname.

People with the surname include:
 Alain Bordeleau (born 1956), Canadian long-distance runner
 Bruno Bordeleau (1868–1929), Canadian politician
 Charles Bordeleau, Canadian police chief
 Christian Bordeleau (born 1947), Canadian hockey player
 J. P. Bordeleau (born 1949), Canadian hockey player
 Jeremy Bordeleau (born 1987), Canadian canoeist
 Patrick Bordeleau (born 1986), Canadian hockey player
 Paulin Bordeleau (born 1953), Canadian-born French hockey player
 Sébastien Bordeleau (born 1975), Canadian-born French hockey player
Thomas Bordeleau (born 2002) American Ice Hockey Player
 Yvan Bordeleau 
(born 1942), Canadian politician

French-language surnames